Michael Atingi-Ego is a Ugandan economist, who was appointed Deputy Governor of the Bank of Uganda, on 29 March 2020. At the time of his appointment, he served as the Executive Director of the Macroeconomics and Financial Management Institute of Eastern and Southern Africa (MEFMI), based in Harare, Zimbabwe.

Background and education
Atingi-Ego was born in Uganda. He attended local primary and secondary schools. He holds a bachelor's degree in Economics from Makerere University, Uganda's oldest and largest public university. His degree of Master of Arts in Economics was awarded by the Cardiff Business School, in the United Kingdom (UK). His Doctor of Philosophy degree, also in Economics, was obtained from the University of Liverpool, also in the UK.

Career
He started out at the Bank of Uganda. He rose through the ranks to become the Executive Director, of Research. In 2008 he took up an assignment with the International Monetary Fund (IMF) as Deputy Director of the African Department (AFR), based in Washington, DC. In September 2018, he was appointed as executive director at MEFMI.

After vetting by the Ugandan parliament, he replaced Louis Kasekende, whose 10-year term at the central bank ended in January 2020. Dr Atingi-Ego assumed office as Deputy Governor of Bank of Uganda, on 3 August 2020.

Other considerations
Atingi-Ego is credited with bringing a wealth of regional and international experience to his new office as Deputy Governor of the Bank of Uganda. While at the IMF, he contributed to IMF work on increasing effectiveness of capacity development and in modernising monetary policy frameworks in developing countries.

In May 2022, Atingi-Ego was recognized by African Banker Magazine as the "Central Bank Governor Of The Year", in recognition of his efforts to tame inflation and maintain foreign exchange stability in Uganda.

See also
 Economy of Uganda
 Adam Mugume

References

External links
 Website of the Bank of Uganda
 Partial List of Publications By Dr Michael Atingi-Ego

Living people
1965 births
Ugandan economists
Makerere University alumni
Alumni of Cardiff University
Alumni of the University of Liverpool
People from Northern Region, Uganda